, commonly known as NSHD, is a Japanese multinational industrial gas manufacturer incorporated in the year 1910 as Nippon Sanso Corporation. Company was founded in 1918.

The company is Japan's largest industrial gas producer and among top five industrial gas suppliers in the whole world. The company currently operates in more than 30 countries worldwide via its own name and subsidiaries. The company holds the brand Thermos under its umbrella and a leading supplier of related household goods.

NSHD is headquartered in 1-3-26 Koyama, Shinagawa-ku, Tokyo in Japan with more than 50 subsidiaries and affiliates in other countries. On 13 May 2014, TNSC at that time and Mitsubishi Chemical Holdings announced that an agreement had been reached whereby Taiyo Nippon Sanso would become an affiliate of Mitsubishi Chemical, which is a part of the core Mitsubishi group. Subsequently, Mitsubishi chemical increased its stake in the company to 50.5%.

History

1910 – established as the Nippon Sanso joint-stock company.

1911 – the start of oxygen production in the Osaki factory.

1918 – Renamed to Nippon Sanso Corporation and the company formally founded on 19 July.

1934 – air separation unit for making, Kamata factory (Tokyo, Ota-ku, newly established).

1935 – First air separation unit completed for domestic usage

1954 – established the Kawasaki plant, liquefied oxygen (Japan's first) and high-purity nitrogen, argon started manufacturing.

1955 – Tokyo factory (formerly Kamata factory) was separated, and Nippon Rika Kogyo Co., Ltd., changed its name to Nippon Sanso Corporation its trade name.

1971 – the first time in the world of LNG cold energy utilization air separation unit, completed in Tokyo liquefied oxygen (Ltd.).

1989 – Thermos Japan acquisition and acquisition of Matheson (compressed gas & equipment)

1999 – Matheson and Tri-Gas Company merged to become Matheson Tri-gas

2001 – A spin-off household products business, Thermos Ltd., was established.

2003 – Acquired plant engineering division of Hitachi's Air separation units.

2004 – by the merger of Nippon Sanso Corporation and Taiyo Toyo Sanso Co., Ltd., changed its name to the Taiyo Nippon Sanso Corporation

2006 – Acquired all shares of Hitachi Oxygen, Ltd. as a wholly owned subsidiary.

2007 – is with Japan Carbonate Co., Liquefied Carbon Dioxide Co., Ltd., as well as a holding company to integrate the carbon dioxide business of Japan Liquid Charcoal Holdings Co., Ltd. and Taiyo Nippon Sanso, Japan Liquid Charcoal launched the Corporation.

2009 – Acquired Valley National Gases via its subsidiary Matheson Tri-Gas.

2010 – Acquired majority shares of K-Air Specialty Gases to begin operation in India and agreed to build first ASU in India.

2012 – Acquired Leeden ltd for its operations in Malaysia and Singapore.

2013 – Nichikita Oxygen (in Hokkaido Group Companies) renamed to Hokkaido Sanso.

2014 – Acquired by Mitsubishi Chemical Holdings Group(MCHG) to become as a consolidated subsidiary.

2014 – Acquired Continental Carbonic Products, Inc. in US and becomes largest independent supplier of Dry Ice in US.
2015 – Acquired Thailand based Air Products Industry and Australian industrial gas company Renegade Gas Pty Ltd.
2016 – Acquired Chinese company Jilin OLED Material Tech and US company Sulfa Trap

2016 – Agrees to acquire 18 air separation plants and eight other plants of Air Liquide, US. The deal also includes acquisition of three retail stores of Airgas, a subsidiary of Air Liquide

2016 – Agrees to acquire Supagas of Australia for US$225 million . After this purchase, TNSC improves its global market share to 7%.

2018 – Acquired SAIL Technologies, Inc. to foray into Amino Acid segment.

2018 – Acquired Europe operation of Praxair

2019 – Acquired 5 HyCO plants of Linde North America

Industries served
TNSC's primary products are:

Electronics Materials and Equipment, including high purity gas, gas mixtures, purification devices and other hardware and services – provides stable supplies of nitrogen and various material gases to the electronics industry. They also supply equipment such as small-scale nitrogen generators, MOCVD equipment and exhaust gas abatement systems.

Industrial Gas – TNSC provides stable supplies of industrial gases such as oxygen, nitrogen and argon to a wide range of industries, including the steel, chemical, electronics, automobile, construction, shipbuilding, and food industries. In addition to developing and manufacturing gas-applied devices and equipment, they also play a vital role at the forefront of science and environmental preservation and are actively engaged in the national hydrogen project.

Plant and Engineering – This division manufactures air separation plants, space simulation chambers and equipment related to liquid helium.

LP Gas – This division supplies LP gas for use in a wide variety of applications including taxis and other commercial vehicles, air conditioners, and aerosol propellants.

Housewares and related goods – This division makes Thermos-branded products, as well as stainless steel water bottles. Under its former name Nippon Sanso K.K., the company developed the world's first stainless steel vacuum-insulated bottle in 1978, vacuum bottles and related supplies.

References

External links
 Taiyo Nippon Sanso global site 
 Matheson website

Industrial gases
Chemical companies based in Tokyo
Chemical companies established in 1910
Japanese companies established in 1910
Companies listed on the Tokyo Stock Exchange
Japanese brands
Energy companies established in 1910
Mitsubishi Chemical Holdings